Lauren Wilson (born April 19, 1987) is a Canadian figure skater. She is the 2002 Canadian junior national champion. She trained under Michelle Leigh and Doug Leigh. She placed 8th at the 2002 World Junior Figure Skating Championships. Wilson was one of Michelle Trachtenberg's ice skating doubles in the 2005 Disney movie Ice Princess.
After leaving skating because of a stress injury she completed a bachelor's degree in communication studies at the University of Waterloo, a master's degree from Ryerson University and is currently working on her PhD from the University of Toronto and focusing on sport communication and intervention programming for university athletes. She was assistant coach for the Ryerson University ice skating team in 2011/2012 and will be acting head coach for the 2012/2013 year. 
Lauren is the sister of former NHL (and current KHL) player Kyle Wilson (ice hockey).

Competitive highlights

 N = Novice level; J = Junior level

External links
 

1987 births
Living people
Canadian female single skaters
People from Oakville, Ontario
Sportspeople from Ontario